Eladio Benítez Amuedo (24 February 1939 – 23 October 2018) was an Uruguayan footballer who played as an inside left.

Career
Benítez played professionally between 1957 and 1970 for Racing Club de Montevideo, Deportes Temuco, Green Cross, Unión La Calera and Rangers de Talca.

He earned 8 international caps for Uruguay, and was a squad member at the 1959 South American Championship in Ecuador.

References

1939 births
2018 deaths
Uruguayan footballers
Uruguay international footballers
Racing Club de Montevideo players
Deportes Temuco footballers
Club de Deportes Green Cross footballers
Unión La Calera footballers
Rangers de Talca footballers
Association football inside forwards
Uruguayan expatriate footballers
Uruguayan expatriate sportspeople in Chile
Expatriate footballers in Chile